Tollesbury Wick is a  nature reserve east of Tollesbury in Essex. It is managed by the Essex Wildlife Trust.

This is coastal freshwater marsh which is grazed by sheep, and is worked by traditional methods which encourage wildlife. Areas of ungrazed rough pasture have badgers, and field voles and pygmy shrews are hunted by hen harriers and short-eared owls.

There is access from the sea wall only to a footpath to a bird hide.

References

 Essex Wildlife Trust